Ivanopil (translit. Population:  In 2001, population was 3,993.

References

Urban-type settlements in Berdychiv Raion
Berdychiv Raion
Zhitomirsky Uyezd
Volhynian Voivodeship (1569–1795)